Pedro Augusto Borges da Costa (born 3 March 1997), better known as just Pedro Augusto, is a Brazilian footballer who plays as a midfielder for C.D. Tondela.

Club career
Pedro Augusto made his professional debut with São Paulo FC in a 2-0 Campeonato Paulista loss to on 17 January 2018. On 17 July 2019, Pedro August moved to C.D. Tondela in the Portuguese Primeira Liga.

References

External links

Zero Zero Profile

1997 births
Living people
People from Ubá
Brazilian footballers
Association football midfielders
C.D. Tondela players
Esporte Clube São Bento players
São Paulo FC players
Primeira Liga players
Brazilian expatriate footballers
Expatriate footballers in Portugal
Sportspeople from Minas Gerais